Peam Kaoh Sna is a khum (commune) of Steung Trang District in Kampong Cham Province, Cambodia.

It is the birthplace of Cambodia's Prime Minister, Samdech Hun Sen.

Villages

Peam Krau
Peam Knong
Dei Leu
Tuol Roka
Dei Doh
Preaek Sangkae Kaeut
Preaek Sangkae Lech
Kaoh Kandal
Srae Sangkae

References

Communes of Kampong Cham Province